The Asher Independent School District is a school district based in Asher, Oklahoma, Oklahoma United States. It contains an elementary school, a middle school, and a high school. The district-wide mascot is the Indians.

See also
 List of school districts in Oklahoma

References

External links
 Asher Overview
 Asher Public Schools

School districts in Oklahoma
Education in Pottawatomie County, Oklahoma